The Palestine Monetary Authority (PMA) is the emerging central bank of Palestine. The PMA, located in Ramallah, was established in 1994 following the signing of the Protocol on Economic Relations (Paris Protocol) between the Palestinians and Israel. It is an independent public institution responsible for the formulation and implementation of monetary and banking policies, to safeguard the banking sector and to ensure the growth of the national economy in a balanced manner.

PMA supervises the 13 Palestinian and foreign banks operating in the West Bank and Gaza Strip. It is not responsible for the issue of a Palestinian currency.

PMA operates under the authority of PMA Law Number 2 of 1997, an act of the Palestine Legislative Council, and the Banking Law Number 9 of 2010.

The logo of the PMA pays homage to the Palestinian pound, minted and circulated under the British Mandate. The logo contains the name of the PMA in English and Arabic, written on the historic 5 mils coin.

Objectives
PMA aims to maintain monetary and financial stability and to promote sustainable economic growth through:

 effective and transparent regulation and supervision of banks, specialized lending institutions and money changers operating in Palestine.
 overseeing the implementation and operation of modern, efficient payment systems.
 development and execution of monetary policy designed to achieve price stability.

PMA is active in promoting financial inclusion policy and is a member of the Alliance for Financial Inclusion.

PMA vision
PMA's vision is to be a full-fledged and a modern central bank for an independent and sovereign Palestinian state, capable of achieving monetary stability and keeping inflation under control, and maintaining financial stability, thereby contributing to further development in the Palestinian financial sector, promoting integration into the regional and global economy, and ultimately, fostering high rates of sustainable economic growth in the Palestinian territories.

Governors
The governors of the PMA have been:

Fouad Bseiso, December 1994 - November 2001
Amin Haddad, December 2001 - February 2005
George al-Abed, February 2005 - November 2007
Jihad al-Wazir, January 2008 - November 2015
Azzam Shawwa, November 2015 - January 2021
Feras Milhem, January 2021 —

See also

 Economy of the Palestinian territories
 List of central banks

References

External links
 
 Official PMA Facebook Page
 Official PMA Twitter Page
 Official PMA Youtube Page

Palestine
Economy of the State of Palestine
1994 establishments in the Palestinian territories
Organizations established in 1994